Stephanie Luzie Meier (born April 6, 1974) is a German gothic and symphonic metal singer. She used to sing in the bands Atargatis and Darkwell. Meier quit all of her band projects because she did not have enough time left over for music anymore, choosing to focus on her work in Bavarian public administration.

Discography

With Atargatis
Alba Gebraich (EP, 1999)
Accurst from the Deep (EP, 2002)
Divine Awakening (EP, 2004)
Wasteland (2006)
Nova (2007)

With Darkwell
Metatron (2004)
"Strange" (Single, 2004)
"Fate Prisoner" (Video, 2004)

Guest appearances
Seasons in Black – Deadtime Stories (2005): Vocals on "Bloody Tears"
Diodati – Souls Lament (2005): Vocals
Dope Stars Inc. – Neuromance (2005): Vocals on "Infection 13 (DJmO remix)"

References

1974 births
Living people
Women heavy metal singers
German heavy metal singers
21st-century German women singers